Michael O. Moore (born January 17, 1963) is an American politician from Millbury, Massachusetts, who serves as the Massachusetts state senator for the Second Worcester District. The district comprises the senator's hometown of Millbury, as well as seven other communities including parts of the city of Worcester. He is member of the Democratic Party who has served in the Massachusetts Legislature since January 7, 2009.

Education 
Michael Moore is a graduate of Millbury Memorial High School, Quinsigamond Community College and Western New England College. He holds a master's degree in criminal justice from Western New England College.

Early career 

Born and raised in the town of Millbury, Michael Moore devoted his entire adult life to public service. A graduate of the Waltham Police Academy, he began his 22-year law enforcement career as a Massachusetts Environmental Police officer, eventually becoming an investigator in the Massachusetts Attorney General’s office.

In 2005, he was appointed Assistant Deputy Superintendent at the Worcester County Sheriff’s office, where he oversaw the Community Service Program, inmate reintegration program, and senior citizen community outreach safety programs. Under his leadership, the Sheriff's Office created the Worcester County TRIAD senior citizen program, working to identify and address senior citizen safety concerns in individual towns throughout the county with programs that include house numbering, 911 Cell Phone Bank, Beacon of Light, File for Life, and many more. Michael Moore was also responsible for development of the Area Law Enforcement Response Transmission (ALERT) program, which sends a daily email out to law enforcement officials on recently released inmates, and the Responsible Fatherhood Initiative, a Department of Revenue sponsored program that confirms parenthood of inmates to reduce welfare fraud. The Community Service Program saved Worcester County cities and towns over $3.8 million in labor costs.

Elected to the Millbury Board of Selectmen in 2001, Senator Moore served three terms improving the quality of life in the town where he grew up. In 2004, during his tenure on the board, The Shoppes at Blackstone Valley, the largest economic development project in Millbury history, opened, expanding the town's commercial tax base by approximately $1 million annually. He was overwhelmingly re-elected to the Board of Selectmen in 2004 and 2007.

Legislative career 
Michael Moore was elected to represent the people of the Second Worcester District in the Massachusetts Senate in November 2008, earning 60% of the vote.

During his first term, Senator Moore chaired the Joint Committee on Community Development and Small Businesses, overseeing legislation to protect the Commonwealth's small and family-owned businesses. Moore also served as Vice Chair of the Joint Committee on Elder Affairs, and sat on the Joint Committee on Environment, Natural Resources and Agriculture, the Senate Committee on Bonding, Capital Expenditures, and State Assets, and the Senate Committee on Post Audit and Oversight.Senator Moore also serves on various boards and legislative advisory committees advocating for issues such as higher education, Central Massachusetts or issues of statewide importance for the. Currently, he serves on the Advisory Board for the Dr. Lillian R. Goodman Department of Nursing at Worcester State University, is a member of the Massachusetts Workforce Investment Board, acting-Senate Chairman of the Central Massachusetts Legislative Caucus, a member of the Biotech Caucus and a member of the Manufacturing Caucus. Moore is also a vice-Chair of the Council of State Governments' Eastern Regional Conference's Education Committee. He also serves as the Co-Chairman of the Council of State Governments' Intergovernmental Affairs Committee and Chair of the Council of State Governments' Eastern Region Education Committee. He is a member of the New England Board of Higher Education Legislative Advisory Committee and serves on the Council of State Governments' Federalism Task Force and is a member of the Council of State Governments' International Committee.

Towns represented 
Senator Moore represents the Second Worcester District, comprising eight communities in Central Massachusetts. The district includes the towns of Auburn, Grafton, Leicester, Millbury, Shrewsbury, Upton, precincts 2 and 4 in Northbridge, and wards 5-7 and precincts 1 and 5 in ward 8 of the city of Worcester.

Current committee membership 
Senator Moore serves on nine legislative committees in the Massachusetts Legislature.

 Joint Committee on Higher Education (Chair)
 Joint Committee on Public Safety and Homeland Security (Vice Chair)
 Senate Committee on Ways and Means
 Joint Committee on Ways and Means
 Joint Committee on Labor and Workforce Development
 Senate Committee on Intergovernmental Affairs
 Senate Committee on Post Audit and Oversight
 Senate Committee on Bonding, Capital Expenditures and State Assets
 Special Senate Committee on Opioid Addition Prevention, Treatment and Recovery Options

See also
 2019–2020 Massachusetts legislature
 2021–2022 Massachusetts legislature

References

External links 
 
 

Democratic Party Massachusetts state senators
People from Millbury, Massachusetts
Living people
Massachusetts city council members
21st-century American politicians
1963 births